Orsolya Pintér (born 18 October 1975) is a Hungarian diver. She competed at the 1996 Summer Olympics and the 2000 Summer Olympics.

References

External links
 

1975 births
Living people
Hungarian female divers
Olympic divers of Hungary
Divers at the 1996 Summer Olympics
Divers at the 2000 Summer Olympics
Divers from Budapest
Sportspeople from Budapest